Zīj-i Sulṭānī is a Zij astronomical table and star catalogue that was published by Ulugh Beg in 1438–1439.  It was the joint product of the work of a group of Muslim astronomers working under the patronage of Ulugh Beg at Samarkand's Ulugh Beg Observatory. These astronomers included Jamshīd al-Kāshī and Ali Qushji, among others.

The Zij-i-Sultani was not surpassed in accuracy until the work of Taqi al-Din and Tycho Brahe in the 16th century.

The serious errors which Ulugh Beg found in previous Zij star catalogues (many of the earlier ones were simply updates on Ptolemy's work, adding the effect of precession to the longitudes) induced him to redetermine the positions of 992 fixed stars, to which he added 27 stars from al-Sufi's Book of Fixed Stars (964), which were too far south for observation from Samarkand. This catalogue, one of the most original of the Middle Ages, was edited by Thomas Hyde at Oxford in 1665 under the title Jadāvil-i Mavāzi' S̱avābit, sive, Tabulae Long. ac Lat. Stellarum Fixarum ex Observatione Ulugh Beighi, by Gregory Sharpe in 1767, and in 1843 by Francis Baily in Vol. XIII of the Memoirs of the Royal Astronomical Society.

In 1437, Ulugh Beg determined the length of the sidereal year as 365.2570370...d = 365d 6h 10m 8s (an error of +58s). In his measurements over many years he used a 50 m high gnomon. This value was improved by 28s, 88 years later in 1525 by Nicolaus Copernicus (1473–1543), who appealed to the estimation of Thabit ibn Qurra (826–901), which was accurate to +2s. However, Ulugh Beg later measured another more precise value as 365d 6h 9m 35s, which has an error of +25s, making it more accurate than Copernicus' estimate which had an error of +30s. Ulugh Beg also determined the Earth's axial tilt as 23;30,17 degrees in sexagesimal notation, which in decimal notation converts to 23.5047 degrees.

See also 
 Zij
 Ulugh Beg Observatory

Notes

References 
 E.S. Kennedy, A Survey of Islamic Astronomical Tables, Transactions of the American Philosophical Society, (1956) 46(2), pp. 3–4, 44-5.
 L.P.E.A. Sédillot. Tables astronomiques d’Oloug Beg, commentées et publiées avec le texte en regard, Tome I, 1 fascicule, Paris; 1839.
 L.P.E.A. Sédillot. Prolégomènes des Tables astronomiques d’Oloug Beg, publiées avec Notes et Variantes, et précédées d’une Introduction. Paris: F. Didot, 1847.
 L.P.E.A. Sédillot. Prolégomènes des Tables astronomiques d’Oloug Beg, traduction et commentaire. Paris: 1853.

1437 books
Astronomical tables
Astronomical works of the medieval Islamic world
Astrological works of the medieval Islamic world